The China-Eurasia Economic Cooperation Fund (CEECF) is a Chinese state-backed investment fund created to invest in projects in the countries of One Belt, One Road.

Investments
  In December 2015, CEECF entered into a cooperation agreement with the Russian Direct Investment Fund and Vnesheconombank in the presence of Li Keqiang and Dmitry Medvedev during a state visit by the Russian prime minister to Beijing.

References

Belt and Road Initiative
Private equity firms of China